The 1983 Masters (officially the 1983 Benson & Hedges Masters) was a professional non-ranking snooker tournament that took place between from Sunday 23 January to Sunday 30 January 1983 at the Wembley Conference Centre in London, England. The event was increased to 16 players and extended from 6 to 8 days. Although there were 16 players, they were not the top 16 ranked players that would compete in the following years. BBC Television coverage did not start until 26 January and so only two of the eight first round matches were televised.

Cliff Thorburn of Canada became the first overseas player to win the competition beating Ray Reardon in the final to win the first of his three titles. The first round match between Bill Werbeniuk and Alex Higgins saw the biggest crowd ever recorded at a snooker match in the UK  2,836 attended the match at the Conference Centre. The highest break of the tournament was 128 made by Terry Griffiths.

Field
For the first time there were 16 players in the event. Alex Higgins, the World Champion was the number 1 seed with Steve Davis, the defending champion seeded 2. Places were allocated to the leading 8 players in the world rankings and there were two sponsors wild-card entries, Jimmy White (ranked 10) and Terry Griffiths (ranked 14). The remaining six players qualified based on their performance in the Professional Players Tournament in October. They were semi-finalist John Virgo, quarter-finalists Joe Johnson, Dean Reynolds and Bill Werbeniuk, and Mark Wildman and Tony Meo who lost in the last 16. Joe Johnson, Dean Reynolds and Mark Wildman were making their debuts in the Masters.

Main draw

Final

Century breaks
Total: 4
 128  Terry Griffiths
 114  Tony Meo
 113  Ray Reardon
 108  Eddie Charlton

References 

Masters (snooker)
Masters
Masters (snooker)
January 1983 sports events in the United Kingdom